Knut Sven-Erik Magnusson (13 October 1942 – 22 March 2017) was a Swedish singer and musician known for being the lead singer of the band Sven-Ingvars that during their sixty-year history played many different types of popular music, and was at times regarded as a dansband. The band had its last tour during the summer of 2016 with their last show on 21 August that year in Blekinge.

He died on 22 March 2017, of cancer.

References

External links 

1942 births
2017 deaths
Swedish male singers
Swedish rock guitarists
Swedish saxophonists
Male saxophonists
Swedish clarinetists
Dansband singers
Deaths from cancer in Sweden
20th-century saxophonists